The Challenger Internazionale Dell'Insubria was a tennis tournament held in Chiasso, Switzerland since 2006. The event was part of the ATP Challenger Series and was played on outdoor clay courts.

Werner Eschauer was the only player to win both singles and doubles title the same year.

Past finals

Singles

Doubles

External links 
 
ITF search

ATP Challenger Tour
Chiasso
Tennis tournaments in Switzerland
Clay court tennis tournaments